The southern giant salamander (Isthmura maxima) is a species of salamander in the family Plethodontidae. It is endemic to Mexico and known from the Sierra Madre del Sur of western and southern Oaxaca and eastern Guerrero.

Description
Adult males measure  and females  in snout–vent length (SVL). The tail is moderately long, on average 99% of SVL in males and 85% SVL in females. The coloration is variable, but in general it is uniformly black, with markings consisting of parallel rows of vivid red-orange to pale orange spots on the head, body, and proximal part of the tail. The body is robust, and the head is large and relatively broad but with short snout. The limbs are long and robust. The fingers and toes are well developed but relatively short and without appreciable webbing.

Habitat and conservation
It appears to live in permanent burrows. Although it seems to tolerate some habitat modification, urbanization and changed agricultural practices are potential threats. It is not known from any protected areas.

References

maxima
Endemic amphibians of Mexico
Fauna of the Sierra Madre del Sur
Amphibians described in 2005
Taxa named by David B. Wake
Taxonomy articles created by Polbot